The Travemünder Woche (engl. Travemünde Week) is the second largest annual race week in sailing in Germany (after Kiel Week). It is held since 1892 by the end of July at the traditional seaside resort Travemünde located at the Bay of Lübeck of the Baltic Sea. The main organizer of this event is the Yacht Club of Lübeck.

In 2007 there will be around 3000 sailors participating in the 118. race week with more than 800 boats.

Participating classes of sailing dinghies

Contender, 420, 470, 505, 49er, Flying Dutchman, Laser, Tornado, javelin

Participating classes of keel boats and yachts

Nordic Folkboat, Dragon, J/22, J/24

See also
Yacht Club of Lübeck
Norddeutscher Regattaverein

External links

 Travemünder Woche
 LYC
 NRV
 HSC

1892 establishments in Germany
Annual sporting events in Germany
Baltic Sea
Sport in Lübeck
Recurring sporting events established in 1892
Sailing competitions in Germany
Tourist attractions in Schleswig-Holstein
Yachting races
Bay of Lübeck